Bagamoyo, is a historic coastal town founded at the end of the 18th century, though it is an extension of a much older (8th century) Swahili settlement, Kaole. It was chosen as the capital of German East Africa by the German colonial administration and it became one of the most important trading ports for the Germans along the East African coast along the west of the Indian Ocean in the late 19th and early 20th century. Today, it is the capital of the Bagamoyo District in Pwani Region. In 2011, the town had 82,578 inhabitants.

Location

History
The original settlement, Kaole, was founded  CE, and grew into an important trading town by the 13th century. The Kaole Ruins contain the remnants of two mosques and 30 tombs, dated back to the 13th century. Their main trading goods were fish, salt and gum, among others. Around the 17th century this area began growing in prosperity and by the 18th century it was an important stop in the caravan and slave trade, acquiring the name Bagamoyo. It became the most important trading entrepot of the east central coast of Africa in the late 19th century.

In the late 18th century, Muslim families settled in Bagamoyo, all of which were relatives of Shamvi la Magimba in Oman. They made their living by enforcing taxes on the native population and by trading in salt, gathered from the Nunge coast north of Bagamoyo.
In the first half of the 19th century, Bagamoyo became a trading port for ivory and slave, with traders coming from the African interior - places as far as Morogoro, Lake Tanganyika and Usambara- on their way to Zanzibar. This explains the meaning of the word Bagamoyo ("Bwaga-Moyo") which means "Lay down your Heart" in Swahili. It is disputed whether this refers to the slave trade which passed through the town (i.e. "give up all hope") or to the porters who rested in Bagamoyo after carrying  cargoes on their shoulders from the Great Lakes region (i.e. "take the load off and rest"). There is considerable debate regarding the extent of the slave trade as a major export in Bagamoyo, with archival analysis suggesting that ivory was the primary export over slaves, and that many of the caravan porters on the ivory route were free wage laborers as opposed to slaves. However, the history of the slave trade features prominently in the shared culture of its residents and organizations such as UNESCO emphasize its importance as a cultural heritage site memorializing the slave trade in East Africa.

The slave trade in East Africa was officially prohibited in the year 1873, but continued surreptitiously to the end of the 19th century.

In 1868, Bagamoyo local rulers, known as majumbe, presented the Catholic "Fathers of the Holy Ghost" with land for a mission north of the town, the first mission in East Africa. This caused resistance by the native Zaramo people which was mediated by representatives of Sultan Majid and, after 1870, by Sultan Barghash. Originally the mission was intended to house children who were rescued from slavery, but it soon expanded to a church, a school, and some workshops and farming projects.

But Bagamoyo was not only a trade centre for ivory and copra; it was also a starting point for renowned European explorers. From Bagamoyo they moved out to find the source of the River Nile and explored the African inner lakes. Some of these were Richard Francis Burton, John Hanning Speke, Henry Morton Stanley and James Augustus Grant. Although often believed so, David Livingstone had never been to Bagamoyo in his lifetime. Only after his death he was laid out in the Old Church's tower (nowadays named Livingston Tower) to wait for the high tide to come in and ship his body to Zanzibar.

Bagamoyo was the first capital of the colony while serving as the German headquarters of German East Africa (first under the auspices of the German East African Company and then the German Imperial Government) between 1886-1891. Dar es Salaam became the new capital of the colony in 1891. The town was apparently where SS-Oberführer Julian Scherner was born in 1895. When the German Empire decided to build a railway from Dar es Salaam into the interior in 1905, Bagamoyo's importance began to decline.

First World War

In the East African campaign of World War I, British and Empire forces attacked Bagamoyo in August 1916. The Royal Navy bombarded the town with the protected cruiser  on 1 August and battleship  on 4 August.

The Royal Navy landed a force of 176 armed sailors, 65 Royal Marines and 55 Zanzibar Rifles to attack the town.

A kite balloon flown by  directed a naval bombardment of German positions ashore. A seaplane from Himalaya bombed German trenches in the town, and then assisted in directing naval gunnery.

The Imperial German Army defended Bagamoyo with 60 German troops and 350 Askari Schutztruppe, commanded by German officers.

The German defences of Bagamoyo included trenches along the shore, around the Arab and German forts, and on a hill just south of the town. German artillery included at least two small field guns on the shore, plus one of the 105 mm naval guns that had been salvaged from the cruiser , and installed in an emplacement on the hill with 100 rounds of ammunition.

Königsbergs gun engaged the monitors Severn and Mersey, which were some distance out to sea, but it could not be lowered enough to engage vessels nearer the shore. Three smaller Royal Navy vessels, including the armed tugboat , got within 500 metres of the German gun and opened fire on it with their 3-pounder guns. A British machine gun section then attacked the hill, eventually forcing the German artillerymen to abandon their gun and retreat. This was the first of Königsbergs guns to be captured by British forces.

Many civilians, whatever their religion, took refuge in the church at the Catholic mission. One British 12-inch shell hit the church, damaging the baptistry, and the two priests in charge of the mission moved the civilians to the Mission House. By the evening, German forces were retreating from their trenches. Royal Marines, supported by Zanzibar Rifles, captured the German Governor's house. The remainder of the town fell to British forces thereafter.

British forces lost one Royal Marine officer and ten men. German forces lost two officers and ten men, and another 19 were captured by the British.

Massacre
The Bagamoyo revolt is a seemingly forgotten massacre on the Arab population in the old slave port in January 1964.

2006–present
Bagamoyo is a center for dhow sailboat building. The Department of Antiquities in Tanzania is working to maintain the ruins of the colonial era in and around Bagamoyo and to revitalize the town. In 2006, the department applied for World Heritage Site status, in the cultural category. The Bagamoyo College of Arts (“Chuo cha Sanaa”) has been an internationally famous arts college in Tanzania, teaching traditional Tanzanian painting, sculpture, drama, dancing, and drumming. In 2007 based on the college, the Bagamoyo Arts and Cultural Institute (TaSUBa) was established.

Its history and proximity to Dar es Salaam has led Bagamoyo to be more diverse than some other areas of the country. Bagamoyo is home to many ethnic groups, including the Wakwere, Wazaramo, Wazigua, Maasai, and Waswahili. Although Swahili culture dominates, many different cultures coexist in Bagamoyo, including people of Arab descent.

In 2018, the new port construction began that will transform the area.

Transport

Port
In 2013, a large two berth intermodal container deepwater port terminal was proposed by Tanzanian government. Called Bagamoyo Port, it will be constructed at Mbegani, near Bagamoyo. China planned to invest US$10B to make Bagamoyo the most important port in Africa by 2017. The port is part of the Maritime Silk Road.

In 2018, the project got the go ahead and work started in about June/July. It will be built in association with the state-owned China Merchants Port, it will include a special economic zone. The US$ 10bn project is backed by an Omani sovereign wealth fund.

In 2019 Tanzanian President John Magufuli announced the suspension of the project.

Public transport
Bagamoyo is served by the Bagamoyo Daladala stand near Bagamoyo road south east of Bagamoyo.

Education
Bagamoyo hosts the Bagamoyo Arts and Cultural Institute.

Notable inhabitants
Sewa Haji Paroo, 19th century businessman of Indian origin
Julian Scherner, German Nazi Party official and a high-ranking member in the SS
Hukwe Zawose, Tanzanian traditional musician

Twin towns and sister cities
 Vallejo, California

Gallery

See also 
 List of Panamax ports
 List of former national capitals
Bagamoyo Arts and Cultural Institute
Historic Swahili Settlements

References

External links

Bagamoyo history
 Bagamoyo photos
Unveiling Zanzibar's unhealed wounds

Swahili people
Swahili city-states
Swahili culture
Populated places in Pwani Region
Economy of German East Africa
Former colonial capitals
Port cities in Tanzania
Bagamoyo District